Stephen Robert Franken (May 27, 1932 – August 24, 2012) was an American actor who worked in film and television for over fifty years.

Career
Franken, the son of a Hollywood press agent, was born in Brooklyn, New York and graduated from Cornell University in 1953. His first screen role was in 1958 as Willie in the episode "The Time of Your Life" on the anthology series Playhouse 90.

Another early role was as Bully in the 1961 episode "The Pit" of the series The Rebel, starring Nick Adams. He played the lead guest-starring role in the 1961 episode "The Case of Willie Betterley" in Lock Up. In 1962, he was cast as Dunc Tomilson in "The Yacht-Club Gang" on Checkmate. He appeared as Jerry Allen in two episodes of Mr. Novak. In 1964, he appeared in The Time Travelers. In 1965, he appeared in "Birth of a Salesman" on McHale's Navy, and in "Tim and Tim Again" on My Favorite  Martian.

Producer Rod Amateau saw him in a Los Angeles stage production of Say, Darling and cast him as playboy dilettante Chatsworth Osborne Jr. on the sitcom The Many Loves of Dobie Gillis, starring Dwayne Hickman. Franken appeared as a recurring guest in numerous episodes from 1960 to 1963. He attributed the character's look of pained condescension to an ulcer he had suffered since the age of 14 when his mother had died. He appeared in 1964 on Petticoat Junction as the son of the villain, Homer Bedloe in Bedloe and Son, played by Charles Lane.

Franken played another rich wastrel on the short-lived sitcom Tom, Dick and Mary. Franken appeared in the famous 1963 Perry Mason episode "The Case of the Deadly Verdict" as murderer Christopher Barton.

Immediately after Dobie Gillis was cancelled, Franken was cast as Lieutenant Samwell "Sanpan" Panosian in the Gary Lockwood series The Lieutenant, episode To Take Up Serpents, the first television series created by Gene Roddenberry. He played other military roles, such as a decorated U.S. flier turned arms-dealer and traitor in "The Gun Runner Raid" episode of The Rat Patrol and as a P.O.W. lieutenant in the Fred MacMurray film Follow Me, Boys!. From 1966 to 1971, he appeared in various roles in at least six episodes of Bewitched.

Franken appeared as the drunken waiter Levinson in the 1968 Blake Edwards film The Party, alongside Peter Sellers. One journalist, writing on the fortieth anniversary of the film, stated:

From 1970 to 1973, he appeared five times on Love, American Style. He appeared as Officer Albert Porter in three episodes of Adam-12 from 1971 to 1972 as well as Ralph Salisbury in the 1971 episode "The Ferret." In 1972, he appeared as Jonas Lasser on the season three episode "The Courtship of Mary's Father's Daughter" on The Mary Tyler Moore Show.

He appeared on Barney Miller in 1975 (episode: "The Arsonist") and again in 1981 (episode: "Resignation"). In 1979, he starred as Tom Voorhies alongside Michael Constantine in Disney's The North Avenue Irregulars. He appeared with Peter Sellers in 1980's The Fiendish Plot of Dr. Fu Manchu.

He acted and directed in various episodes of Insight. He appeared in small roles in such contemporary television series as  Murphy Brown, The King of Queens and Seinfeld. From 2002 to 2003, he provided voices for Law & Order computer games. He voiced Professor Eugene Atwater in the short-lived 1996 Warner Bros. animated series Road Rovers.

He voice-acted as Rundle in the 1993 Batman episode "The Mechanic" and was Mr. Beal in Detention episodes "Little Miss Popular" and "Comedy of Terrors" (both 1999). The following year, he voiced the role of Mr. Janus in the episode "Grounded" of Static Shock and provided voices in Smurfs (1981), The Adventures of Don Coyote and Sancho Panda (1990), and Spawn (1997).

Death
Franken died on August 24, 2012 at a nursing and rehabilitation center in Canoga Park, California of complications from cancer, aged 80. He had three daughters, two from his first marriage to Julia Carter, and one from his second marriage to Jean Garrett.

Filmography

Film

Television

References

External links

"GAF Super 8 Movie Cameras from $49.50" (1971 TV commercial with Henry Fonda and Steve Franken) at OVGuide.com. Retrieved August 18, 2012.

1932 births
2012 deaths
Male actors from California
Male actors from New York City
American male film actors
American male television actors
Jewish American male actors
People from Brooklyn
People from Greater Los Angeles
20th-century American male actors
Deaths from cancer in California
21st-century American male actors
Cornell University alumni
21st-century American Jews